The snub rhombicuboctahedron is a polyhedron, constructed as a truncated rhombicuboctahedron. It has 74 faces: 18 squares, and 56 triangles. It can also be called the Conway snub cuboctahedron in but will be confused with the Coxeter snub cuboctahedron, the snub cube.

Related polyhedra
The snub rhombicuboctahedron can be seen in sequence of operations from the cuboctahedron.

See also
 Expanded cuboctahedron
 Truncated rhombicosidodecahedron

References

 John H. Conway, Heidi Burgiel, Chaim Goodman-Strauss, The Symmetries of Things 2008,

External links 
 George Hart's Conway interpreter: generates polyhedra in VRML, taking Conway notation as input

Polyhedra